Otak Creek is a stream in the U.S. state of Mississippi.

Otak is a name derived from the Choctaw language purported to mean "beaver pond, lake". Variant names were "Otakoocha Creek", Otakooche Creek", and "Otokoochee Creek".

References

Rivers of Mississippi
Rivers of Jasper County, Mississippi
Mississippi placenames of Native American origin